V’jačesláv Serhíjovyč Kernózenko (born 4 June 1976 in Havana, Cuba) is a former Ukrainian football goalkeeper and current football assistant manager.

International career 
He played for Ukraine national under-21 football team. He also was called up to Ukraine national football team in first time 15 November 1997 for match against Croatia, but first match spent 31 May 2000 against England. Last, 5th match, for National representation he played 24 May 2008 in match against Netherlands.\ Kernozenko was also eligible to represent Cuba internationally. His parents were Ukrainian immigrants.

Honours

Ukrainian Premier League: champion 1997, 1998, 1999, 2000
Ukrainian Cup: winner 1998, 1999, 2000; runner-up 2004

References

External links 

Kernozenko's FC Dnipro Profile
Football Federation of Ukraine Profile 

1976 births
Living people
Ukrainian footballers
Ukraine international footballers
Ukraine under-21 international footballers
People from Havana
Cuban people of Ukrainian descent
FC Dnipro players
FC Dynamo Kyiv players
FC Dynamo-2 Kyiv players
FC Dynamo-3 Kyiv players
FC Arsenal Kyiv players

FC Kryvbas Kryvyi Rih players
Ukrainian Premier League players
Association football goalkeepers
Ukrainian football managers
Expatriate football managers in Kazakhstan
Ukrainian expatriate sportspeople in Kazakhstan
Cuban emigrants to Ukraine
Cuban emigrants to the Soviet Union